In 2007 the Castleford Tigers competed in National League One and the 2007 Challenge Cup.

2007 Season summary

National League One table

2007 Season players

2007 Signings/Transfers
Gains

Losses

Re-Signings

References

Castleford Tigers seasons
Castleford Tigers seasons